Harish Shankar (born 1984 in Malaysia) is a Malaysian-German conductor.

Life 
Shankar was born in Malaysia. He first studied piano in Lübeck with Konstanze Eickhorst and later conducting with Eiji Oue in Hanover and with Gunter Kahlert in Weimar. Prior to joining the masters programme in Weimar, he led the "Orquesta de Barro" in Trujillo, Perú in 2011.

Shankar led the Harvestehude Symphony Orchestra in Hamburg from 2013 to 2016 and held the position of "Junior Fellow in Conducting“ at the Royal Northern College of Music in Manchester in 2014/2015. In 2016/2017, he was Resident Conductor of the Malaysian Philharmonic Orchestra and subsequently First Kapellmeister at the Theater Vorpommern in 2017/2018.

In 2015, he was awarded the third prize at the Jorma Panula conducting competition in Vaasa, Finland.

In 2019, Shankar was appointed First Kapellmeister at the Meiningen State Theatre.

References

External links 
 Website
 Profile on the Meiningen State Theatre website

1984 births
21st-century conductors (music)
German conductors (music)
Living people
German people of Malaysian descent